Extinction Level Event is a term for an extinction event introduced in the 1998 film Deep Impact, in which the phrase's (fictional) use in scientific research was a key plot point. It has since seen occasional use outside the film.

It may also refer to an album by Busta Rhymes and its sequel:
E.L.E. (Extinction Level Event): The Final World Front, third album released in 1998
Extinction Level Event 2: The Wrath of God, tenth album released in 2020

See also
 Extinction-level threat
 ELE (disambiguation)
 Extinct (disambiguation)
 Extinction (disambiguation)
 Extinction Event (disambiguation)